Elaine is a small town in Phillips County, Arkansas, United States, in the Arkansas Delta region of the Mississippi River. The population was 636 at the 2010 census.

The city is best known as the location of the Elaine massacre of September 30–October 1, 1919, in which an estimated 237 black people were killed in the rural county by rampaging white mobs. Five whites died in the events. This was one of the worst incidents of racial and labor violence in American history. Black sharecroppers were attempting to organize a farmers' union, which the planters resisted.

History 

Phillips County was developed in the antebellum years for cotton plantations, which relied on the labor of enslaved African Americans. Their work produced the wealth of the major large planters. Cotton continued to be the major commodity crop into the 20th century in this area but, after the war, blacks often had to work as sharecroppers or tenant farmers. By the turn of the century, Arkansas and other southern states had disenfranchised most blacks, excluding them from the political system, and imposed Jim Crow laws. 

Black sharecroppers began to try to organize a farmers' union after World War I. They were seeking better payment and accounting from white landowners of the area cotton plantations. Whites resisted any change and often tried to break up their meetings.

On September 30, 1919, two white men, including a local deputy, tried to break up a meeting of black sharecroppers who were trying to organize a farmers' union. After a white deputy was killed in a confrontation with guards at the meeting, word spread to town and around the area. Hundreds of whites from Phillips and neighboring areas rushed to suppress the blacks, and started attacking blacks at large. Governor Charles Hillman Brough requested federal troops to stop what was called the Elaine massacre. White mobs spread throughout the county, killing an estimated 237 blacks before most of the violence was suppressed after October 1. Five whites also died in the incident. The governor accompanied the troops to the scene; their use had been approved by U.S. President Woodrow Wilson. Sharecroppers generally remained at a disadvantage in dealing with white landowners.

The county continues to rely on agriculture, but mechanization reduced the need for farm labor. Many African Americans left this area in the Great Migration of the early 20th century. In the 21st century, most farms are industrial scale. Some seasonal Hispanic migrant workers have been hired in this area since the late 20th century.

At 6:15 PM, April 26, 2011, a tornado – part of the 2011 Super Outbreak – hit the Elaine area. Most of the tornado's damage was concentrated in Friars Point and Coahoma, Mississippi.

Geography
Elaine is located at  (34.308595, −90.854201).

Demographics

At the 2000 census there were 865 people in 330 households, including 222 families, in the city. The racial makeup of the city was 58.15% Black or African American, 39.08% White, 0.92% from other races, and 1.85% from two or more races.  6.01% of the population were Hispanic or Latino of any race. Agriculture includes rice production, which uses seasonal migrant laborers from Mexico and Latin America in the town, nearby Lake View, and the Helena area.
Of the 330 households 31.8% had children under the age of 18 living with them, 34.2% were married couples living together, 30.3% had a female householder with no husband present, and 32.7% were non-families. 31.2% of households were one person and 18.5% were one person aged 65 or older.  The average household size was 2.62 and the average family size was 3.31.

The age distribution was 31.8% under the age of 18, 10.8% from 18 to 24, 19.5% from 25 to 44, 21.2% from 45 to 64, and 16.8% 65 or older.  The median age was 32 years. For every 100 females, there were 80.2 males.  For every 100 females age 18 and over, there were 73.5 males.

The median household income was $19,479 and the median family income  was $22,813. Males had a median income of $22,386 versus $18,056 for females. The per capita income for the city was $12,640.  About 33.5% of families and 41.1% of the population were below the poverty line, including 59.1% of those under age 18 and 26.5% of those age 65 or over.

Education
The Marvell–Elaine School District serves the community. Marvell Primary School and Marvell High School in Marvell serve Elaine.

Previously the Elaine School District served the community. On July 1, 2006, the Elaine district merged into the Marvell district. When the district existed, it operated Lucilia Wood Elementary School and Elaine High School.

Notable people
 Levon Helm, musician
 John Hughey, country musician
 Barry Williamson, Texas politician, was reared in Elaine.
 Jimmy McCracklin, blues musician, was born in Elaine
 Richard Wright, author

References

Cities in Phillips County, Arkansas
Cities in Arkansas